Vi ska bara leva klart is the debut album by Swedish pop group Raymond & Maria, released on August 18, 2004.

Track listing
 "Nej"
 "Ingen vill veta var du köpt din tröja"
 "Redan idag"
 "Ingenting för dig"
 "De älskar dig"
 "Min pappa"
 "Det går aldrig att bli dum igen"
 "Vi ska bara leva klart"
 "Som"
 "När jag blundar"

Charts

References

2004 debut albums